Glyn Roberts (born 17 November 1982) is an Australian playwright,  producer and educator.

Career
Roberts has a Masters in Writing for Performance from Victorian College of the Arts.

He is the co-founder and former Creative Director of Melbourne's new writing theatre: MKA: Theatre of New Writing until September 2013. He is currently Program Manager at Brisbane's premiere contemporary theatre company, La Boite Theatre Company. The MKA: Theatre of New Writing  was the 2012 recipient of the Green Room Special Award for Contribution to Independent Theatre in Melbourne.

Roberts' play Triangle was short-listed for the 2011 Patrick White Playwrights' Award and received two nominations for the 2012 Green Room Award (Theatre-Independent) for Tania Dickson (Direction) and Production. His play She Dances Like a Bomb was placed on the highly commended list for the 2013 Griffin Award.

As of September 2013 he is a writer-in-residence with Red Stitch Actors' Theatre. where he developed his seminal work "The Handjob Brothers", directed by Darcel Morney.

Works
 The Flock and the Nest, directed by Gary Abrahams, St Michael's Drama Studio and Red Stitch Writers, 2014
 She Dances Like a Bomb,  Master of Writing for Performance Public Reading Program, 2012
 Triangle directed by Tanya Dickson, MKA: Theatre of New Writing, 2012
 The Horror Face directed by Felix Ching Ching Ho, MKA: Theatre of New Writing, 2011
 The Handjob Brothers directed by Darcel Morney

References

1982 births
Australian dramatists and playwrights
Living people